Sam Rinzel (born June 25, 2004) is an American junior ice hockey defenseman who plays for the Waterloo Black Hawks of the USHL. He was drafted by the Chicago Blackhawks in the first round of the 2022 NHL Entry Draft with the 25th overall pick in the draft.

Career statistics

Regular season and playoffs

International

References

External links

2004 births
Living people
American ice hockey defensemen
Chicago Blackhawks draft picks
National Hockey League first-round draft picks
People from Chanhassen, Minnesota
Waterloo Black Hawks players